Minidisk, Mini Disk, MiniDisc, Mini Disc or similar may refer to:

 MiniDisc, a magneto-optical disc-based music and data storage format developed by Sony
 Minidisk (CMS), a minidisk formatted for use by the CMS operating system under CP-67 or VM
 Minidisk (floppy), 5.25-inch floppy diskette type
 Minidisk (VM), a virtual disk provided by the CP-67 or VM operating system
 , a consumer mechanical digital audio disc from Telefunken
 Olivetti Minidisk, a 2.5-inch sleeveless floppy diskette format by Olivetti for their P6040 (1975)
 Minidisc (album), a Gescom album
 MiniDiscs [Hacked], a music compilation by Radiohead

See also
 Mini CD, a smaller variant of the standard full-size Compact Disc
 MiniDVD, a smaller variant of the standard full-size DVD format
 MiniDVD (disambiguation), formats similar to the MiniDVD
 Micro disk
 MD (disambiguation)